Douglas Harrison (born October 22, 1949) is Canadian former politician. He served in the Legislative Assembly of New Brunswick from 1987 to 1991 as a Liberal member from the constituency of Sunbury.

References

1949 births
Living people